Helotropha is a genus of moths of the family Noctuidae.

Species
 Helotropha leucostigma (Hübner, [1808])
 Helotropha reniformis (Grote, 1874)

References
Natural History Museum Lepidoptera genus database
Helotropha at funet

Apameini